Allium teretifolium is a plant species native to Xinjiang, Kazakhstan and Kyrgyzstan.

Allium teretifolium produces clusters of narrow bulbs, each about 10 mm in diameter. Scapes are up to 50 cm long, round in cross-section. Leaves are tubular, about 1 mm wide, shorter than the scape. Flowers are pink or violet.

References

teretifolium
Onions
Flora of temperate Asia
Plants described in 1878